Team Cyclingnews.com–Down Under was a British professional cycling team that rode UCI Continental Circuits races. The leader for 2007 was Belgian Nico Mattan and the squad included 2006 British champion, Hamish Haynes. Eric Vanderaerden was a directeur sportif.

In 2008 it wanted to become a professional continental team and signed Steffen Wesemann and Bas Giling. It also had an agreement with Marc Lotz but Pedaltech signed two British professionals instead.

The UCI did not give the team the professional continental licence. Potential sponsors pulled out, including Johan Museeuw, the bike maker. and Cyclingnews.com. Then the team manager, who was its owner, faked having cancer and could not run the team. It collapsed.

Team roster

Former riders
 Russell Downing (2006) - Former British Champion
 Matthew Wilson (2001)

References

External links
Team History on cyclingnews.com

Defunct cycling teams based in the United Kingdom
Cycling teams based in the United Kingdom
Cycling teams established in 2001
Cycling teams disestablished in 2009